= Grace Le Baron =

American writer of children's books

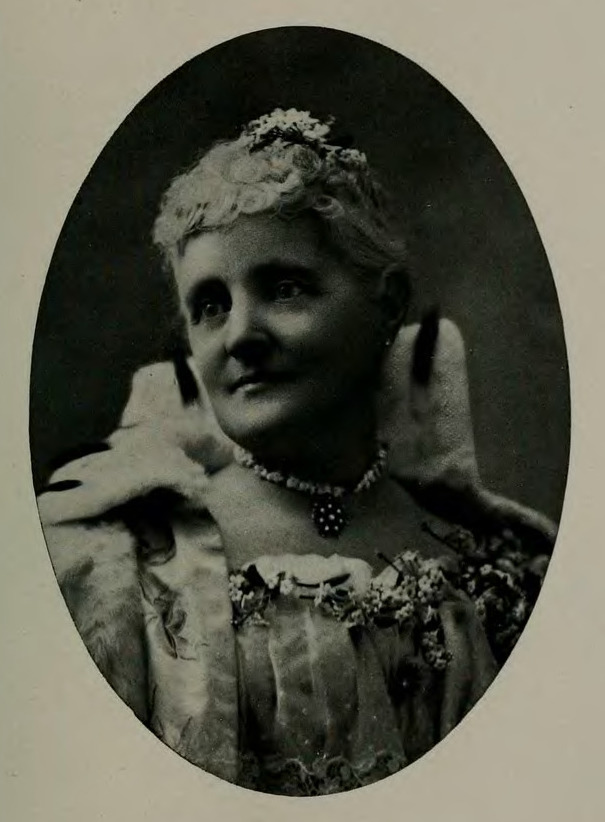
- Born: June 22, 1845; Lowell
- Died: June 16, 1916 (aged 70); Boston
- Occupation: Writer
- Parent(s): John Goodwin Locke; Jane Ermina Starkweather Locke

Grace Le Baron Upham (June 22, 1845 – June 16, 1916) was an American writer of children's books who published under the name Grace Le Baron.

She was born Grace Le Baron Locke on June 22, 1845, in Lowell, Massachusetts, the youngest daughter of John Goodwin Locke and the author Jane Ermina Starkweather Locke. In 1850, her family relocated to Boston, where she was raised. In 1870 she married Henry Macy Upham.

Grace Le Baron died on June 16, 1916, in Boston.

== Bibliography ==
- Little Miss Faith, 1894 by Lee & Shepard, Boston (Hazelwood Stories, vol. 1)
- The Ban of the Golden Rod, 1895
- Little Daughter, 1895 by Lee & Shepard, Boston (Hazelwood Stories, vol. 2)
- The Rosebud Club, 1896 by Lee & Shepard, Boston (Hazelwood Stories, vol. 3)
- Queer Janet, 1897 by Lee & Shepard, Boston (Janet trilogy, vol 1)
- Told under the Cherry-trees, 1890 by Lee & Shepard, Boston
- Twixt You and Me, 1898 Little, Brown & Co
- Jessica's Triumph, 1901 by Lee & Shepard, Boston (Janet trilogy, vol 2)
- The Children of Bedford Court, 1905 (Janet trilogy, vol 3)
- The Victory of Peace, 1909
